Originality is the quality of novelty or newness in created works.

Original(s) or Originality may also refer to:

Film and television
 Original programming, a media term
 Original (film), a 2009 Danish/Swedish film
 Original Film, an American film production company
 Original Productions, an American television production company

Music
 Original P, a funk band

Albums
 Original, a 2004 album by Ella Koon
 Originals (Kurupt album), a compilation album by Kurupt
 Originals (Prince album), a compilation album by Prince

Songs
 "Original" (Leftfield song), 1995
 "Original" (Cir.Cuz song), a 2015 song by Norwegian duo Cir.Cuz featuring Emilia
 "D. Original", a 1994 song by Jeru the Damaja

Other uses
 Original (catamaran) (19th century), a catamaran built by Englishman Mayflower Crisp in Rangoon, Burma
 Originality (album)
 Original Software, a UK software-testing products and services company
 Originals: How Non-Conformists Move the World, a 2017 book by American psychologist Adam Grant

See also 
 Origin (disambiguation)
 The Original (disambiguation)